The 2003 Des Moines mayoral election was held on October 7, and November 4, 2003, to elect the mayor of Des Moines, Iowa, USA. Frank Cownie was elected.

Results

First round

Runoff

References 

Des Moines
2003
Des Moines